Counter-admiral Gabriel Paul Auphan (November 4, 1894, Alès – April 6, 1982) was a French naval officer who became the State Secretary of the Navy (secrétaire d'État à la Marine)  of the Vichy government from April to November 1942.

Naval officer 

Entered the École navale in October 1911, enseigne de vaisseau in October 1914, he served on board Jeanne-d'Arc in the northern squadron, then in April 1915, in the Mediterranean where he participated to operations in the Dardanelles.

In September 1915, assigned to the intelligence service established in an island in the Levantine Mediterranean, he organized a network covering the entire Levant. He continued to lead this mission as of August 1916, as second in command of aviso Laborieux, then at Kastelórizo on the coast of Anatolia.

Second in command of submarine  in September 1917, he participated in campaigns in the Adriatic until the end of the war. In January 1919, he was sent to Rijeka to serve in the intelligence service, then in Egypt and Lebanon. Lieutenant de Vaisseau in June 1919, he commanded the submarine Le Verrier in the Mediterranean (1920–1922), and wrote studies of analysis on the role of torpilleurs during the Battle of Jutland and the employment of tactical submarines engaged in chases by groups in which he advocated the anticipation of ideas which were later realized by Admiral Donitz during the Second World War.

Apprentice at École de guerre navale (1923–1924), he commanded in 1925, the submarine  in the Mediterranean. Capitaine de corvette in January 1927, he was assigned in the previous November to the cabinet of Georges Leygues, minister of the Navy, where he particularly worked towards the specific enacting of the organic decree of April 22, 1927 which reorganized the navy.

He was appointed to command the destroyer  in the Mediterranean in 1929, Capitaine de frigate in April 1930, he was tasked to manage and run the application school of the enseignes de vaisseau embarked on board the 1st Light Division which replaced in provision the Jeanne-d'Arc and conducted accordingly a long campaign on the African coasts, Antilles and the Mediterranean.

Director of the center of studies and second in command of the École navale at Brest in 1933, he served then in the cabinet of François Piétri, minister of the Navy (1934–1935), then commanded the cruiser Émile-Bertin in squadron in the Atlantic. Capitaine de Vaisseau in October 1936, he received in October 1937 the command of the Jean-d'Arc and the application school of the enseignes de vaisseau with whom he conducted a tour around the world (1937–1938) and a second campaign in the Atlantic and the Pacific. He exercised the functions of military governor of Polynesia (1938–1939). He was accordingly assigned to studies section of the État-Major general. In anticipation of the war which was expected, he was sent to London to coordinate future operations with the Royal Navy. He held his own views regarding the evacuation at Dunkirk or by Operation Catapult.

Second chief in command of general headquarter staff of maritime forces in October 1939, he assumed with Admirals François Darlan, Maurice Le Luc and Négadelle, the reception of various inbound convoys.

At the service of Vichy 

At Vichy, the counter-admiral Auphan was part of the tenant groups which harbored a political view of attentisme (the act of waiting and refraining until situations become more clear and precise). Designated as chief of the headquarter staff of maritime forces in August 1941, he maintained contact with the American diplomatic representation to Vichy by transmitting various couriers. State Secretary of the Navy as of April 1942, he opposed the demanding German requirements related to materials of merchant tonnage. Along with French Army general Maxime Weygand, he assumed a staunch position of opposition to the politics of collaboration at the corps of the government. A partisan of a suspension of combat between French and Americans during the Anglo-American disembarking of November 8, 1942 in North Africa, he opposed those who wanted to continue to mount combat along the Germans.

On November 11, 1942, chef d'état major, counter-admiral Auphan ordered the two admirals of Toulon to:
 oppose, without shedding blood, the entry of foreign troops in the establishments, the aerial bases, and naval auxiliaries;
 oppose similarly the entry of foreign troops on board of the fleet's naval vessels; by local negotiations, effort one self to arrive to a mutual accord;
 in case impossible, scuttle the fleet.

This last solution which was applied, on the night of November 26 and 27, 1942, when admirals André Marquis, maritime prefect and Jean de Laborde, commanding forces of the high-seas, heard that the Germans were moving forward to attempt to make way with the fleet. After having tried without success to incite Philippe Pétain to leave the metropolis, he tendered his resignation on November 18, 1942.

On August 11, 1944, he was tasked by marshal Pétain to approach général de Gaulle. He was not received and was accordingly arrested.

After 1945 
On August 14, 1946, he was judged and condemned in absentia to forced labor, degraded national status, and confiscation of his properties. On July 19 and 20, 1955, a second hearing condemned him to only five years in prison with probationary measure and five years of degraded national status. In 1956, the State Council gave him back his rank and rights for pension.

Auphan dedicated his life later to writings: a close figure to General Maxime Weygand or Colonel Rémy, he published his souvenirs, defended his views and remained loyal to the memories of Marshal Philippe Pétain. The Counter-admiral Auphan was a member of the Association of Catholic writers until his death, in 1982.

Publications 
 La Lutte pour la vie 1940–1942 ou La Marine au service des Français (1947)
 Mensonges et vérité – Essai sur la France (1949)
 Les grimaces de l'histoire et l'histoire de mes trahisons (1951)
 Les échéances de l'histoire ou l'éclatement des empires coloniaux de l'Occident (1952)
 Le Drame de la désunion européenne (1955)
 La Marine dans l'histoire de France (1955)
 La Marine française dans la Seconde Guerre mondiale (1958)
 Histoire de la Méditerranée (1962)
 Histoire élémentaire de Vichy (1971)
 Histoire de la décolonisation (1975)
 L'honneur de servir (1978)
 Au service de l'Église (1988)

See also 
List of submarines of France
1500-ton class submarines
Georges Cabanier

References

Sources 

 Paul Auphan, Contre-amiral Auphan et Jacques Mordal. La Marine française dans la seconde guerre mondiale, Ed. France-Empire, Paris, 1967, 651 pp. 
 Jacques Mordal, La Marine à l'épreuve : de l'armistice de 1940 au procès Auphan, Édition d'histoire et d'art, Plon, Paris, 1956, 251 p. 
 La marine de Vichy : blocus et collaboration, juin 1940-novembre 1942, Bernard Costagliola, Paris, Tallandier, 2009, total pages 433 .
 Jean-Baptiste Bruneau, " La Marine, cité terrestre du contre-amiral Auphan ", Revue d'Histoire Maritime. La puissance navale, n°16, 2013, pp. 51–64.

1894 births
1982 deaths
People from Alès
French Navy admirals
Ministers of Marine
People of Vichy France
French military personnel of World War I
French military personnel of World War II
French politicians convicted of crimes
French collaborators with Nazi Germany
Fascist politicians